Hemicycla mascaensis is a species of gastropod in the Helicidae family. It is endemic to Spain.

References

Sources

Endemic fauna of the Canary Islands
Molluscs of the Canary Islands
Hemicycla
Endemic fauna of Spain
Gastropods described in 1872
Taxonomy articles created by Polbot